Judith Chichi Okpara  (born 12 July 1971), better known as Afro Candy  (also spelled Afrocandy), is a Nigerian film actress, director, producer, singer-songwriter, model, and pornographic actress. She is the founder and CEO of Invisible Twins Productions LLC.

Early life and education 
Afro Candy was born in Umuduruebo Ugiri-ike, Ikeduru Local government area of Imo State. As a teenager in high school, she was drawn to acting but lost interest after entering college. She gained an associate degree in Office administration and a Bachelor of Science degree in Business Management. In addition, she trained as a fireguard/security officer.

Career 
Discovered by modeling agency King George Models, she was encouraged to pursue acting. She began her career in modeling and appeared in commercials for companies such as Coca-Cola, Nixoderm, and Liberia GSM. She ventured into television, where she played mainly minor roles. In 2004, she made her major film debut as Susan in the Obi Obinali directed film Dangerous Sisters. Her other roles include Nneoma, a village girl in End of the game, and Jezebel in Dwelling in Darkness and Sorrow.

In 2005, she joined her husband in the United States with whom she had two children. After 2 years of living there together, the couple separated. Mazagwu has also starred in films such as Destructive Instinct, How Did I Get Here, Ordeal in Paradise, and The Goose That Lays The Golden Eggs and has played small roles in various Hollywood movies.
As a musical artist, her first single "Somebody Help Me" was released in 2009 followed by her debut studio album which produced the popular hit "Ikebe Na Moni". Also in 2011, she released the single "Voodoo-Juju Woman".

Besides acting and singing, Mazagwu works as a practicing medical billing and coding specialist. she alleged that Nollywood was the cause of death for Ada Ameh.

Filmography 
Dwelling in Darkness and Sorrow
Dangerous Sisters (2004)
The Real Player
End of the Game (2004)
Between Love
Heaven Must Shake
My Experience
Ghetto Crime
Beyond Green Pastures
Destructive Instinct
Queen of Zamunda

See also
 List of Nigerian film producers

References 

1971 births
Living people
Actresses from Imo State
Igbo actresses
Nigerian pornographic film actresses
Nigerian female adult models
Nigerian film actresses
21st-century Nigerian actresses
21st-century Nigerian women singers
Nigerian women singer-songwriters
Nigerian film directors
Nigerian film producers
Nigerian people in health professions
Nigerian musicians
Nigerian female models
Nigerian songwriters